Grateful Dawg is a documentary film released in 2000 which chronicles the friendship and musical relationship of musicians Jerry Garcia and David Grisman. Director and producer Gillian Grisman uses multiple videos, as well as live recordings, to help show this bond between two friends and musicians. It gives a view of Garcia outside the Grateful Dead.

Synopsis 
The film was directed by David Grisman’s daughter Gillian, with cinematography by Justin Kreutzmann, son of Grateful Dead drummer Bill Kreutzmann. The film details when Grisman and Garcia first met in 1964 at a club in Pennsylvania to see Bill Monroe perform, includes interviews with musicians such as Bela Fleck, Peter Rowan and Ronnie McCoury and many live performances of Grisman and Garcia.

DVD 
The Grateful Dawg DVD has the following chapters:

 Start  
 "Grateful Dawg" (Live)
 Early Pickin'
 "The Sweet Sunny South"
 Old and in the Way
 "Pig in a Pen"
 Sweetwater Reunion
 "Dawg's Waltz"
 "Sitting Here in Limbo"
 Sea Shanties
 "Off to Sea Once More"
 Not for Kids Only
 "Jenny Jenkins"
 "Arabia" Intro
 "Arabia"
 "The Thrill is Gone" Intro
 "The Thrill is Gone"
 The Living Room
 "Friend of the Devil"
 End Credits

See also
 Grateful Dawg (soundtrack)

References

External links

Jerry Garcia
2000 films
Documentary films about rock music and musicians